Andrés Pardo de Tavera Luna  (September 9, 1887 – January 22, 1952) was a Filipino architect who built the first air-conditioned building in the Philippines, the Crystal Arcade one of the popular tenant of Manila Stock Exchange (previous site of Paseo de Escolta) Building (now present site of City College of Manila-Escolta Building, demolished in 2016) that was once located on No. 71 Escolta Street, Binondo, Manila. He was assigned as the city architect of the City of Manila from 1920 to 1924. His designs were modernist. Some of them were lost during World War II.

Life and career
Andres Pardo de Tavera Luna was born on September 9, 1887, in Paris, France. His parents are Juan N. Luna and Mari Paz Pardo de Tavera-Luna. He grew up in Paris until he was six years old, when his father committed a crime of passion, on September 22, 1892. His father murdered his mother, Paz and his grandmother, Juliana Morricho and shot them in their heads. He then left with his father after he was acquitted by a French court in February 1893. After spending six months in Barcelona and Paris, they travelled by boat along with his uncle, Gen. Antonio N. Luna to Manila on May 24, 1894. 

Luna was taught art lessons by Miguel Zaragoza, and subsequently Ramon Santa Coloma and Lorenzo Guerrero. In Japan, he studied ceramics, followed by studying architecture at the International Correspondence School, where he earned his diploma in 1911. Later while he stayed in France, he studied at the École des Beaux-Arts. Upon return to the Philippines, he served as the architect of the City of Manila from 1920 to 1924. In 1938, he became a member of the Manila Beautiful Committee which was created for the beautification of the city. Throughout his career, Luna gained recognition for his works, including the St. Louis Exposition and the Philippine Institute of Architects.

He died on January 22, 1952, at the age of 64. He was survived by his American wife, Grace, who later migrated back to the United States after his death.

Works
 Regina Building
 Natalio Enriquez Ancestral House in Sariaya, Quezon, 1931
 Legarda Elementary School, 1922
 First United Building, 1928
 Crystal Arcade Building, 1932
 Alfonso Zobel Mansion
 Manila Hotel, (renovated in 1935)
 St. Cecilia's Hall, St. Scholastica's College, 1932
 Lizares Mansion, Iloilo City
 Chapel of the Crucified Christ, St. Paul University Manila 1927

References

20th-century Filipino architects
1887 births
1952 deaths
Architects from Paris
Filipino expatriates in France